Bis(triphenylphosphine)rhodium carbonyl chloride is the organorhodium complex with the formula [RhCl(CO)(PPh3)2].  This complex of rhodium(I) is a bright yellow, air-stable solid.  It is the Rh analogue of Vaska's complex, the corresponding iridium complex.  With regards to its structure, the complex is square planar with mutually trans triphenylphosphine (PPh3) ligands.  The complex is a versatile homogeneous catalyst.

Synthesis and reactions
Bis(triphenylphosphine)rhodium carbonyl chloride was originally prepared by treating Rh2Cl2(CO)4 with triphenylphosphine.  However, it is typically produced by the carbonylation of Wilkinson's catalyst:
RhCl[P(C6H5)3]3  +  CO  →   RhCl(CO)[P(C6H5)3]2  +  P(C6H5)3
In homogeneous catalysis, this conversion is typically an undesirable side-reaction since [RhCl(CO)(PPh3)2] is a poor hydrogenation catalyst.

Bis(triphenylphosphine)rhodium carbonyl chloride is the precursor to tris(triphenylphosphine)rhodium carbonyl hydride, an important catalyst for hydroformylation.
RhCl(CO)[P(C6H5)3]2  +  NaBH4 +  P(C6H5)3  →   RhH(CO)[P(C6H5)3]3  +  NaCl  +  BH3

References

Organorhodium compounds
Carbonyl complexes
Triphenylphosphine complexes
Chloro complexes
Rhodium(I) compounds